Harmi is a village in Kose Parish, Harju County in northern Estonia. As of 2011, the population of Harmi is 47.

The village is home to Uue-Harmi Manor, established in established in 1646, previously belonging to various Baltic German families such as the Lodes, von Wrangels, von Taubes, Zoege von Mannteuffels and von Hippiuses. The main manor building now houses the Harmi Basic School.

References

Villages in Harju County
Kreis Harrien